Baocheng may refer to

Baocheng, Hainan, a town in Hainan, China
Baocheng, Mian, a township in Mian County, Shaanxi, China
Baocheng River, a river of Hainan
Ji Baocheng, a Chinese educator
Yuan Baocheng, a Chinese politician and Mayor of Dongguan